The 1982 Bavarian Tennis Championships was a men's Grand Prix tennis circuit tournament held in Munich, West Germany which was played on outdoor clay courts. It was the 66th edition of the tournament and was held form 17 May through 23 May 1982. Second-seeded Gene Mayer won the singles title.

Finals

Singles

 Gene Mayer defeated  Peter Elter 3–6, 6–3, 6–2, 6–1
 It was Mayer's only title of the year and the 27th of his career.

Doubles

 Chip Hooper /  Mel Purcell defeated  Tian Viljoen /  Danie Visser 6–4, 7–6
 It was Hooper's only title of the year and the 1st of his career. It was Purcell's 1st title of the year and the 4th of his career.

References

External links 
 ATP Tournament profile
 

 
Bavarian International Tennis Championships
Nabisco Grand Prix
Bavarian Tennis Championships
Bavarian Tennis Championships